Walter Annables (31 October 1911 – 16 August 1979) was an English former professional footballer who played as a full-back.

References

1911 births
1979 deaths
People from Swinton, South Yorkshire
English footballers
Association football fullbacks
Mexborough Athletic F.C. players
Grimsby Town F.C. players
Hull City A.F.C. players
Carlisle United F.C. players
English Football League players